Moral economy refers to economic activities viewed through a moral, not just a material, lens. The definition of moral economy is constantly revisited depending on its usage in differing social, economic, ecological, and geographic situations and times. The concept was developed in 1971 by the British Marxist social historian and political activist E. P. Thompson in his essay, "The Moral Economy of the English Crowd in the Eighteenth Century", to describe and analyze a specific class struggle in a specific era, from the perspective of the poorest citizens—the "crowd".

While Thompson had used the term moral economy in his 1963 book The Making of the English Working Class, it was in the 1971 essay that he provided a thick description of the centuries-old paternalistic feudal moral economy of production and exchange that was rapidly being replaced by the classical political economy. Thompson saw the "crowd" as subjects, not objects, of history. He used the analytical tools of the emerging discipline of social history, writing a "history from below" to provide evidence of how the "crowd" of "tinners, colliers, weavers, hosiery workers, and labouring people" made the decision to riot. They grieved the loss of their livelihood, and faced hunger and in some cases starvation. Thompson traced the root causes to the combined effects of the enclosure system, profiteering during deprivation, soaring prices, and other practices that Thompson associated with free trade, the free market, and the laissez-faire system he identified with Adam Smith's 1776 book The Wealth of Nations. Thompson revealed how peasants' grievances were underpinned by a popular consensus on which moral values constitute a moral economy. This included social norms, and mutual obligations and responsibilities of the various members of a community. As protective laws disappeared, and previously illegal activities became legal or normalized, peasants experienced actual deprivation, and in extreme cases, starvation. Thompson said that the riots were not just a response to physical hunger, but to outrage against what rioters perceived to be the immorality of the new economic system that caused the deprivation.

The term moral economy extends historically to the 18th century. In the 1830s, it was used as a criticism of capitalism, and the classical political economy. Thompson re-invented and rigidly defined and analyzed the concept. In his 1991 review of his 1971 article and its numerous critics, Thompson said that his use of the concept was set within a specific historical context. In order for the concept to be useful, it requires a constantly renewed language.

Through the work of the political scientist James C. Scott in the 1970s and 1980s the concept became more widely used. Scott re-appropriated the concept of moral economics in reference to the experience of 20th century peasants engaged in subsistence agriculture in southeast Asia. The term is unusual in that it was developed by an historian, made popular by a political scientist, and used in disciplines and area studies such as political science, economics, sociology, anthropology, cultural studies, and ecology.

In the 21st century, the term moral economy suffered from a confusing array of definitions, including those that refer to economic activities through a "moral and simplistic" lens.

Use of the term in the 19th century
According to E.P. Thompson, James Bronterre O'Brien used the term in his 1837 criticism of 19th century political economists. Bronterre wrote this anti-capitalist polemic: "True political economy is like a true domestic economy; it does not consist solely in slaving and saving; there is a moral economy as well as political... These quacks would make wreck of the affections, in exchange for incessant production and accumulation... It is indeed the moral economy that they always keep out of sight. When they talk about the tendency of large masses of capital, and the division of labour, to increase production and cheapen commodities, they do not tell us of the inferior human being which a single and fixed occupation must produce."

Thompson's concept
The British Marxist historian E. P. Thompson, who self-described as an empiricist, spent almost a decade gathering evidence for his 1971 Past & Present journal article "The Moral Economy of the Crowd in Eighteenth Century". The article was based on a collaborative project he had undertaken in 1963 with Richard Charles Cobb, who was working on 18th and 19th century protests in France. There is a strong relation between Thompson's "historical writing and his political engagement". In the 1960s, he sided with the students in the student protests at his university, and in the 1980s, he was the most well-known antinuclear intellectual activist in Europe.

In his 2017 book, The Moral Economists, Tim Rogan included Thompson in his trio of the 20th century's "most influential critics of capitalism"—along with R. H. Tawney (1880–1962) and Karl Polanyi—who were read by a broad base of readers, informed research, and had a major influence on public opinion. They were historians—not economists—who challenged utilitarianism in economics as outsiders to the field. They were "theorists of everything economists left out." Tawney, like Thompson, compared the way in which early societies had maintained social cohesion through their norms and mores, in contrast to the "rugged individualism promoted by utilitarianism".

Thompson first used the term moral economy in The Making of the English Working Class in reference to the 1795 food riots in England. Thompson's social history, which is associated with history from below, like that of other British social historians—Raphael Samuel and Christopher Hill—had its antecedents in Georges Lefebvre and the French Annales school. Thompson saw the peasant, the crowds, the working class as subjects not objects of history. Previously, historians presented the peasants and working class "as one of the problems Government has had to handle".

In his 1964 book, The Crowd in History, George Rudé, "explored the pattern of food riots and market disturbances in terms of their geographical distribution, frequency, level of violence". In his 1971 essay, Thompson expanded on the theme of the 18th century riots in England by shifting focus to the mentalité of the 18th crowd—longing for the older disintegrating economic system—described by Thompson as a 'moral economy'—that both paternalistically protected them through crises and dearth, but also held authority over them, and an emerging system, that they sensed, threatened their livelihood and existence. Thompson investigated the mentalité of the crowd, to reveal the thinking underpinning the riots. Thompson investigated how in a particular situation rural England in the 18th century, a crowd of peasants made the decision to riot. Thompson acknowledged that "riots were triggered off by soaring prices, by malpractices among dealers, or by hunger. But these grievances operated within a popular consensus as to what were legitimate and what were illegitimate practices" in marketing, milling, and baking, for example. "This in its turn was grounded upon a consistent traditional view of social norms and obligations, of the proper economic functions of several parties within the community, which, taken together, can be said to constitute the moral economy of the poor. An outrage to these moral assumptions, quite as much as actual deprivation, was the usual occasion for direct action." According to Thompson these riots were generally peaceable acts that demonstrated a common political culture rooted in feudal rights to "set the price" of essential goods in the market. These peasants held that a traditional "fair price" was more important to the community than a "free" market price and they punished large farmers who sold their surpluses at higher prices outside the village while there were still those in need within the village.

Thompson said that the riots had been "legitimized by the assumptions of an older moral economy, which taught the immorality of... profiteering upon the necessities of the people". The riots were a "last desperate effort" on the part of the protestors to re-impose the disintegrating Tudor policies of provision, the "old paternalistic moral economy" that was faced with the emergence of the "economy of the free market," the classical political economy. Thompson pointed out the "contradictory components of paternalistic control and crowd rebellion."

In the essay, Thompson developed and re-invented the term 'moral economy' and the "practices with which it has been associated" by "rigidly" and definitively defining" it—based it on the years of empirical evidence that he had begun gathering in 1963—situating his research within an "interpretive framework", thereby setting a "scholarly standard".

Norbert Götz, whose area of research focus is conceptual history, examined Thompson's moral economy in relation to classical political economy. He described how Thompson "treated the concept as a neologism that had no prior history". In 1991, Thompson acknowledged that he had been assigned paternity of the term, but clarified that he did not coin it. He wrote that he thought that the usage of the term could be dated to at least the mid-18th century. Thompson cited Bronterre O'Brien's 1837 "directly anti-capitalist usage" of the term, which was similar to the way in which Thompson used it. Götz wrote that in pre-capitalist England, the customary order had roots in both the Edwardian and Tudor era and was based on "open" marketplace exchange.

Thompson's "sufficiently attractive" concept of moral economy became "famous," with scholars from other disciplines outside history, such as political science, sociology, and anthropology, adopting it.

Thompson presented a version of the article at an April 1966 conference at the State University of New York. He described moral economy as a "traditional consensus of crowd rights that were swept away by market forces." In this article, Thompson described the bread nexus that emerged in the 18th century as comparable to the cash-nexus of the industrial revolution.

Thompson pit the pre-capitalist moral economy with its traditional and paternalistic values against the "values and ideas of an unfettered market"—the "modern "political economy" associated with liberalism and the ideology of the free market". According to Thompson, the "breakthrough of the new political economy of the free market was also the breakdown of the old moral economy of provision." Thompson emphasized the continuing force of pre-capitalist traditional "moral economy" even as capitalism was rapidly expanding. In the pre-capitalist society, the authorities followed a paternalist tradition of what Thompson called, a moral economy, by which the authorities provided support to the poor in times of dearth and supported fair prices as part of a moral obligation. By the late 18th century, exponents of laissez-faire who criticized the older, traditional system, were encouraged by Adam Smith's highly influential notion of a self-regulating market. The crowd, which included "tinners, colliers, weavers, hosiery workers, and labouring people", regularly rioted against grain merchants and traders who raised their prices in years of dearth in an attempt to reassert the concept of the just price.

Prior to the rise of classical economics in the eighteenth century, the economies in Europe and its North American colonies were governed by a variety of (formal and informal) regulations designed to prevent "greed" from overcoming "morality". In the older system prior to the end of the 18th century, economic transactions were based on mutual obligation. Horwitz said that when national commodities markets began to develop in England in the second half of the 18th century, "the price of grain was no longer local, but regional; this [presupposed for the first time] the general use of money and a wide marketability of goods." Horwitz wrote that there was a radical difference between 18th century laws in Britain and modern contract law the old theory of title of contract "outlived its usefulness". This happened around the same time as organized markets were emerging and the economic system was being transformed. Horwitz criticized late 18th century writers of contract law, such as John Joseph Powell, author of the 1790 "Essay upon the law of contracts and agreements", for denouncing the older systems for undermining the "rule of law". Horwitz said the older systems in the 18th century courts were better ways of writing contract laws, as they were more "equitable conceptions of substantive justice".

To Thompson, the emerging classical political economy was epitomized by Adam Smith's chapter, "Digression concerning the corn trade" in his 1776 The Wealth of Nations. He wrote that this chapter was the "most lucid expression" of the standpoint of the political economy upon market relations in subsistence foodstuffs. In this chapter Smith rejects the bounty imposed by the government on corn exports: "The unlimited, unrestrained freedom of the corn trade, as it is the only effectual preventative of the miseries of a famine, so it is the best palliative of the inconveniences of a dearth; for the inconveniences of a real scarcity cannot be remedied, they can only be palliated." The "profound" influence of his essay was felt in "British government circles" including by William Pitt the Younger, Lord Grenville, and Edmund Burke. He cites examples of British administrators sent to India who resolutely resisted government interventions in the free operation of the market in spite of the "vast exigencies of Indian famine" during the Great Bengal famine of 1770. Amartya Sen estimated that approximately 10 million people died in the famine, which he described as manmade. In England, poor laws and charity protected many from starvation in the 18th century. For example, in 1795, the government enacted the Speenhamland system to alleviate extreme poverty.

According to Thompson, there was a wide consensus of the community that those who engaged in riots were "informed by the belief that they were defending traditional rights or customs." Patrick Collinson said in his 2001 chapter in Puritanism and the Poor that clergymen in the sixteenth and seventeenth century often preached against various economic practices that were not strictly illegal, but were deemed to be "uncharitable". He said that, when the clergy condemned selling food at high prices or raising rents, it is possible that this influenced the behavior of many people who regarded themselves as Christian and might have been concerned about their reputations.

The 1991 compilation of his essays, Customs in Common, included both the original 1971 essay "The Moral Economy" and a chapter devoted to his reflections on the original article. In his 2012 chapter "E. P. Thompson and Moral Economies", in A Companion to Moral Anthropology Marc Edelman said that Thompson's use of 'moral' conflates 'moral' as in 'mores' or customs with 'moral' as the principled stance—especially in terms of the "common good" as defined by "customary rights and utopian aspirations". In his 1991 reflection on his 1971 "Moral Economics", Thompson wrote that "Maybe the trouble lies in the word 'moral'. Moral is a signal which brings on a rush of polemical blood to the academic head. Nothing had made my critics angrier than the notion that a food rioter might have been more 'moral' than a disciple of Dr. Adam Smith." In his 1991 reflection, Thompson responded to the widespread use of the term to which he was associated, to clarify how he had intended it to be understood. His concept of moral economy was focused on a specific geographic, political, social, and temporal context. It included the combination of "beliefs, usages, and forms associated with the marketing of food in the time of dearth" in the 18th century in England. It included, what he called, a "particular moral charge to protest", the "outrage provoked by profiteering in life-threatening emergencies", the "deep emotions" when faced with dearth, and the claims made by the crowds to the authorities at the time.

Thompson responded to his critics such as Istvan Hont and Michael Ignatieff, who rejected Thompson's position on Adam Smith regarding government intervention in the time of a famine.

James C. Scott's moral economy

French anthropologist and sociologist Didier Fassin described how in the 1970s and 1980s the political scientist James C. Scott re-appropriated Thompson's concept of moral economics in anthropology in the United States, A considerable number of researchers investigating social mobilization in developing countries, within the framework of rural political economy, were informed and inspired by Scott's research and his 1976 publication The Moral Economy of the Peasant: Rebellion and Subsistence in Southeast Asia. Scott wrote as an historian, developing his ideas on "production and forms of resistance" in an "academic environment of Marxist anthropology". He undertook his research in the colonial archives in Paris and London. He focused on colonization and decolonization in the peasant world of Burma and Vietnam, which included two unsuccessful uprisings in the 1930s. Scott described how during the colonial era, the economic and political transformations systematically violated what the lower classes perceived as social equity, causing such "indignation and rage that prompted them to risk everything" and making of them the "shock troops of rebellion and revolution". Scott related what he calls the moral economy of the peasant to their ideas of what was meant by economic justice and exploitation, and what constituted the tolerable and the intolerable in the name of economic justice. The peasant's moral economy was based on the value system that underlies the "expression of emotions" which in "their extreme form" results in the "emergence of revolts." Scott's moral economy, which was written at a time when American imperialism was being questioned, is an "important scientific" contribution to American social science.

Scott acknowledges the key role played by Karl Polanyi's The Great Transformation in informing his own work. Polanyi's has been criticized for reifying society and romanticizing the premarket society.

Scott, citing Polanyi, described how farmers, tenants, and laborers invoked "moral economies or market logic" when it would serve their interests against market forces that threatened them. Scott said that the struggles in specific localities and temporal spaces were unique. The kind of market regulation they struggled with was not based on a logical or abstract notion of market relations, but was informed by "historical origins and institutional structure of any particular economy."

In the introduction Scott described the moral economy of the "safety first" "subsistence ethic" as a consequence of "precapitalist peasant societies" existing "too close to the margin" and faced with the "fear of food shortages" in 19th century France, Russia, Italy, and Southeast Asia in the 20th century.

Scott cites and respects the work of both Barrington Moore Jr., the author of the 1966 Social Origins of Dictatorship and Democracy: Lord and Peasant in the Making of the Modern World, and Eric R. Wolf author of the 1969 Peasant Wars of the Twentieth Century, but differentiates his own focus and approach from theirs.

Scott wrote, "To begin instead with the need for a reliable subsistence as the primordial goal of the peasant cultivator and then to examine his relationships to his neighbor, to elites, and to the state in terms of whether they aid or hinder him in meeting that need, is to recast many issues." Scott cited Richard Charles Cobb, the author of the 1970 book, The Police and the People: French Popular Protest 1789-1820.

Since Thompson and Scott, the term moral economy, used in social history, has been widely adopted in fields such as economics, sociology, and anthropology related to the interplay between cultural mores and economic activity. It describes the various ways in which custom and social pressure coerce economic actors in a society to conform to traditional norms even at the expense of profit.

In a 2002 journal article on customary tenure by Bill Grigsby, an assistant professor of rural sociology, based on his 1994 field research in two villages in eastern Senegal, Grigsby cites both Karl Polanyi and Scott.

Moral economy: beyond Thompson and Scott
In the chapter, "The 'Moral Economy' of the English Crowd: Myth and Reality" John Stevenson criticized Thompson and the other British scholars who, he said, followed the lead of the French Annales school-historians, shifting away from traditional historiography. Stevenson said that their historiography attempted to investigate how social and economic systems really worked by considering all levels of society and by attempting to reveal underpinning collective mentalité. In his 1975 book, Stevenson was critical of Thompson for his attempt to "decode" the actions and "reconstruct the underlying assumptions and attitudes" of "plebeian culture" in the larger the context of "social and economic change". He rejected Thompson's concept of moral economy underpinned by what Thompson called "extraordinary deep-rooted pattern of behaviour and belief" which legitimised their protests against the "propertied and those in authority".

In the 1998 book Moral Economy by the University of Colorado's professor emeritus of economics John P. Powelson, he wrote: "In a moral economy, with today's technology no one should be poor… The moral economy captures the benefits of technological invention through classic liberalism while using sidewise checks and balances to prevent environmental damage, ethnic and gender bias, and distorted distributions of wealth... In the moral economy, governments facilitate but rarely mandate." Powelson relates the concept of a "moral economy" to the balance of economic power. His moral economy is one in which there is a balance between interventionism and libertarianism; between economic factors and ethical norms in the name of social justice. Powelson sees a moral economy and economic prosperity as mutually reinforcing.

The term moral economy continued to be used in disciplines such as history, anthropology, sociology and political science in 2015.

Steven Shapin's 2009 The Scientific Life: A Moral History of a Late Modern Vocation is indebted to Thompson's re-invention of the term in 1971.

Götz, along with political scientist Johanna Siméant-Germanos, who focuses on social movement studies, and Joakim Sandberg, whose specialty is normative ethics, undertook extensive literature reviews on the theme of "Moral Economy: New Perspectives", in which they traced the "varied history" of the term moral economy from its "formative influence" in Thompson's original 1971 article to its use and meaning in 2015.

In his 2020 book Humanitarianism in the Modern World Götz and his co-authors from a perspective of the moral economy, drew on philosophical, humanitarian, and medical ethics, to examine how donors and relief agencies endow aid choices, appeal for, allocate, and account for aid.

In his Journal of Global Ethics 2015 article Sandberg sought to enhance understanding of the concept of moral economy through the use of more "precise and stringent" descriptions of "moral attitudes and traditions" than those currently used by empirical researchers by using the lens of normative ethics.

In his publications, Geoffrey Hodgson called for economists to balance utilitarian tendencies with moral considerations. A 2000 Studies in Political Economy journal article built on this to call for economists to revive and develop the concept of moral economy in "contemporary advanced economies." The author described moral economy as one that "embodies norms and sentiments regarding the responsibilities and rights of individuals and institutions with respect to others."

In The Efficient Society, Canadian philosopher Joseph Heath wrote that Canada in 2001 had achieved the proper balance between social needs and economic freedom, and as such comes close to being a moral economy.

A University College of Cork paper describes how "concept of the moral economy when employed as an analytical tool to comprehend the essentially conservative inclination of discommoded social interests that embarked on collective action in order to sustain traditional entitlements, to maintain extant economic arrangements, or to permit access to foodstuffs at moments of acute price inflation, has considerable value" in regards to uprisings in the 18th and 19th century in Ireland.

The Quaker Institute for the Future (QIF), established in 2003 in Pennsylvania, and the related Moral Economy Project, emerged from the legacy of the economist Kenneth Boulding, the author of 1966 article, "The economics of the coming spaceship earth". Boulding was among the first social scientists to call attention to the need for an integrated, holistic, ecological worldview as the key focus of progressive policy and action. The 2009 publication, Right Relationship: Building a Whole Earth Economy, which is part of that project and supported by the QIF, says that the well-being of the planet requires a whole earth economy, which they also call a moral economy. The authors described the development of a moral economy as one which includes a new ecologically and morally coherent "bottom line" for "resource use and for the governance of the common good. The authors address key questions regarding the purpose, function, appropriate size, fairness, and governance of a world economic system and propose new ideas to place our economy in correct relationship with the earth's ecosystem. They argue that such a moral economy is essential if we are to avoid systemic collapse as our "growth economy" outstrips the earth's limited ability to recycle our waste, and as the Earth's inventory of critical raw materials and minerals is used up, in the face of growing population and growing affluence within those populations.

Since at least 2008, while the use of the term moral economy has increased in the social sciences, the clarity of the terminology has not improved. There are many different different and "confusing" definitions assigned to the term, including those that refer to economic activities through a "moral and simplistic" lens, according to an article in the Anthropological Theory journal. Moral economic activity is rooted in mutual obligations between people engaged in transactions over time. The author builds on the work of both Thompson and Scot, and identifies a distinction between moral values simply set within the "context of economic activity" and moral values that arise from the economic activity itself. The author calls for clearer definition of moral economy that would have "substantive benefits of a better approach to economic activity and circulation and a more explicit and thoughtful attention to moral value."

In the 2011 book, The Moralization of the Markets, the authors write that the "moral economy is more resonant now than ever."

Thompson was described in 2020 list as one of the "most important social thinkers of our age", whose work informed critical theory, alongside Karl Marx, Walter Benjamin, Fernand Braudel (who was highly influential in the Annales school), Mikhail Bakhtin, Carlo Ginzburg, and Immanuel Wallerstein.

See also
 Economic anthropology
 Free rider problem
 Intentional community
 Just price
 Moral hazard
 Moral panic
 Non-market economics
 Perverse incentive
 Social dilemma

Notes

References

Further reading
 
 
  
 
 

Economic ideologies
Economy by field
Ethics
Market failure
Economy